Azize Hlali (born December 7, 1989) is a French-Moroccan welterweight Muay Thai fighter. He is a former WPMF European Champion.

Biography and career
At the age of 12, Hlali took up practicing Muay Thai.

On April 9, 2011, he defeated Daniel Rivero Garcia via second-round TKO to win the WPMF European 142 lb title.

On April 29, 2017, Azize Hlali faced the legendary Saenchai at Phoenix Fighting Championship in Lebanon, where he lost by unanimous decision.

Azize Hlali fought former two-time K-1 World MAX champion Buakaw Banchamek in the inaugural event of All Star Fight on August 20, 2017, losing to the legend by first-round knockout.

On October 28, 2017, Azize Hlali faced Abdellah Ezbiri in the 2017 Glory Featherweight Contender Tournament at Glory 47: Lyon, losing by unanimous decision.

Hlali faced Serhiy Adamchuk at Glory 53: Lille in the 2018 Glory Featherweight Contender Tournament on May 12, 2018, getting eliminated by the Ukrainian via a unanimous decision loss in the Semi-Final.

Azize Hlali was initially scheduled to make his ONE Championship debut at ONE Championship: Immortal Triumph on September 6, 2019 against Saemapetch Fairtex, filling in for an injured Rafi Bohic. However, the fight was pulled from the event. Hlali finally made his ONE debut at ONE Championship: Masters Of Fate on November 8, 2019. He faced Muay Thai phenom Sangmanee Sor Tienpo. Hlali ended up losing the fight by unanimous decision.

Titles and accomplishments

Muay Thai
Fight League
 2016 Fight League 147 lbs. Championship
 World Professional Muaythai Federation (WPMF)
 2011 WPMF European 142 lbs. Championship
 Fédération Française de Sports de Contacts et Disciplines Associées (FFSCDA)
 2010 FFSCDA National 140 lbs. Championship

Muay Thai record

|-  style="background:#FFBBBB;"
| 2019-11-08|| Loss ||align=left| Sangmanee Sor Tienpo ||  |ONE Championship: Masters Of Fate || Manila, Philippines || Decision (Unanimous) || 3 || 3:00 
|-
|- style="background:#FFBBBB;"
| 2019-01-19|| Loss|| align="left" | Cédrick Peynaud || Nuit Des Gladiateurs 10 || Marseille, France|| KO || 3 ||
|-  style="background:#c5d2ea;"
| 2018-12-01|| Draw ||align=left| Chadd Collins || Credissimo Golden Fight || France || Decision || 5 || 3:00
|-  style="background:#FFBBBB;"
| 2018-05-12|| Loss ||align=left| Serhiy Adamchuk || Glory 53: Lille || Lille, France || Decision (Unanimous) || 3 || 3:00 
|-
! style=background:white colspan=9 |
|-  style="background:#FFBBBB
| 2017-10-28|| Loss ||align=left| Abdellah Ezbiri || Glory 47: Lyon || Lyon, France || Decision || 3 || 3:00  
|-
! style=background:white colspan=9 |
|-  style="background:#FFBBBB;"
| 2017-09-22|| Loss ||align=left| Charlie Peters || Phoenix 3 London || London, United Kingdom || Decision || 3 || 3:00
|-  style="background:#FFBBBB;"
| 2017-08-20 || Loss ||align=left| Buakaw Banchamek || All Star Fight || Bangkok, Thailand || KO || 1 ||
|-  style="background:#cfc;"
| 2017-07-01 || Win ||align=left| Noppakit Kor Kampanart || Chook Muay || France || Decision || 3 || 3:00
|-  style="background:#cfc;"
| 2017-05-27 || Win ||align=left| Morgan Adrar || Warriors Night || France || Decision || 3 || 3:00
|-  style="background:#FFBBBB;"
| 2017-04-29 || Loss ||align=left| Saenchai || Phoenix Fighting Championship 2 || Lebanon || Decision || 3 || 3:00
|-  style="background:#FFBBBB;"
| 2017-03-18 || Loss ||align=left| Yodwicha Por Boonsit || La Nuit Des Titans || France || Decision || 5 || 3:00
|-  style="background:#cfc;"
| 2016-11-27 || Win ||align=left| Fahmongkol Sor.Jor.Danrayong || Warriors Night || France || Decision || 5 || 3:00
|-  style="background:#FFBBBB;"
| 2016-10-28 || Loss ||align=left| Phetmorakot Wor. Sangprapai || YOKKAO 21 & 22 || Hong Kong || KO || 2 ||
|-  style="background:#cfc;"
| 2016-08-04 || Win ||align=left| Qiu Jianliang || Fight League vs. WLF || Morocco || Decision || 3 || 3:00
|-
! style=background:white colspan=9 |
|-  style="background:#FFBBBB;"
| 2016-05-27 || Loss ||align=left| Manaowan Sitsongpeenong || Rajadamnern Stadium || Bangkok, Thailand || Decision || 5 || 3:00 
|-
! style=background:white colspan=9 |
|-  style="background:#FFBBBB;"
| 2016-03-12 || Loss ||align=left| Fabio Pinca || La Nuit Des Titans || France || Decision (Split) || 5 || 3:00
|-  style="background:#cfc;"
| 2015-12-11 || Win ||align=left| Kongsak Sitboonmee || Best of Siam 7 || France || Decision || 5 || 3:00
|-  style="background:#cfc;"
| 2015-08-07 || Win ||align=left| Singmanee Kaewsamrit || West Coast Fighting || France || Decision || 5 || 3:00
|-  style="background:#cfc;"
| 2015-06-19 || Win ||align=left| Singdam Kiatmuu9 || Best of Siam 6 || France || Decision || 5 || 3:00
|-  style="background:#FFBBBB;"
| 2014-11-15 || Loss ||align=left| Marcin Parcheta || Topking World Series || France || KO || 3 ||
|-  style="background:#FFBBBB;"
| 2014-06-14 || Loss ||align=left| Morgan Adrar || Best of Siam 5 || France || Decision || 5 || 3:00
|-  style="background:#FFBBBB;"
| 2014-05-10 || Loss ||align=left| Sak Kaoponlek || La Notte dei Campioni || Italy || TKO || 2 ||
|-  style="background:#FFBBBB;"
| 2014-02-08 || Loss ||align=left| Rungrawee P.K. Saenchai Muaythaigym || La Nuit Des Titans || France || Decision || 5 || 3:00
|-  style="background:#FFBBBB;"
| 2013-11-30 || Loss ||align=left| Fahmongkol Sor.Jor.Danrayong || THAI FIGHT 2013: 2nd Round - 67 kg Tournament Semi-Final ||Bangkok, Thailand || TKO || 2 ||
|-  style="background:#cfc;"
| 2013-10-23 || Win ||align=left| Morgan Adrar || THAI FIGHT 2013: 1st Round - 67 kg Tournament Quarter-Final || Bangkok, Thailand || Decision || 3 || 3:00
|-  style="background:#c5d2ea;"
| 2013-06-15 || Draw ||align=left| Super-X Por. Petchnamchai || Time Fight 3 || France || Decision || 3 || 3:00
|-  style="background:#FFBBBB;"
| 2013-03-17 || Loss ||align=left| Singmanee Kaewsamrit || World Muay Thai Festival 2013 || Thailand || Decision || 5 || 3:00  
|-
! style=background:white colspan=9 |
|-  style="background:#FFBBBB;"
| 2013-02-02 || Loss ||align=left| Super-X Por. Petchnamchai || La Nuit Des Titans || France || TKO || 2 ||
|-  style="background:#cfc;"
| 2012-10-06 || Win ||align=left| Bobo Sacko || Time Fight 2 || France || Decision || 3 || 3:00
|-  style="background:#cfc;"
| 2011-10-15 || Win ||align=left| Frédéric Diaz || Le Choc des Titans 2 || France || Decision || 3 || 3:00
|-  style="background:#cfc;"
| 2011-07-08 || Win ||align=left| Alessio D'Angelo || Impacts Muaythai Show & Party Mix || France || Decision || 5 || 3:00
|-  style="background:#cfc;"
| 2011-04-09 || Win ||align=left| Daniel Rivero Garcia || Time Fight 3 || France || TKO || 2 ||
|-
! style=background:white colspan=9 |
|-  style="background:#cfc;"
| 2011-02-12 || Win ||align=left| Yodsiam Por. Pramuk || La Nuit Des Titans || France || Decision || 5 || 3:00
|-  style="background:#cfc;"
| 2010-10-16 || Win ||align=left| Modibo Diarra || Le Choc Des Titans || France || Decision || 3 || 3:00
|-  style="background:#FFBBBB;"
| 2010-08-11 || Loss ||align=left| Thanasak Topking || Queen's Birthday || Bangkok, Thailand || Decision || 5 || 3:00
|-  style="background:#cfc;"
| 2010-04-24 || Win ||align=left| Vatsana Sedone || Fight Night || France || Decision || 3 || 3:00
|-  style="background:#cfc;"
| 2010-04-03 || Win ||align=left| Sidi Diallo || Finales du Championnat de France de Muaythai || France || Decision || 5 || 3:00 
|-
! style=background:white colspan=9 |
|-  style="background:#cfc;"
| 2010-02-27 || Win ||align=left| Yoan Ha Van || La Nuit du Muay Thai VII || France || Decision || 5 || 3:00
|-  style="background:#cfc;"
| 2009-04-11 || Win ||align=left| Adrien Gref || Muay Thai & Pancrase II || France || KO || 5 ||
|-
| colspan=9 | Legend:

See also
List of male kickboxers

References

1989 births
Living people
ONE Championship kickboxers
Glory kickboxers
French male kickboxers
French Muay Thai practitioners
Welterweight kickboxers